Maulana Md. Tayabullah Hockey Stadium is a field hockey stadium in Guwahati, Assam, India. It has a seating capacity of 2,000 people. This stadium served as the hockey venue for the 33rd National Games of India in 2007, 12th South Asian Games in 2016 and the 2020 Khelo India Youth Games. It was built in 2007 before the 33rd National Games.

References

Field hockey venues in India
Sports venues in Guwahati
Sports venues completed in 2007